Neo Planet is a Japanese simulation video game for the PlayStation. The game was developed by Map Japan and published by GungHo Online Entertainment and Map Japan. It was released in Japan on July 5, 1996. The game was rereleased in Japan for the PlayStation 3 on November 13, 2013, and in the United States on May 20, 2014.

The player must create and build a new land while maintaining ecological equilibrium.

References

1996 video games
PlayStation (console) games
PlayStation 3 games
Simulation video games